The Legend of Robin Hood may refer to:

 The Legend of Robin Hood (1968 film), an NBC television musical
 The Legend of Robin Hood (album), a 2021 album by Chris de Burgh
 The Legend of Robin Hood (board game)
 The Legend of Robin Hood (TV series), a 1975 BBC television serial

See also 
 Robin Hood